Boussu-lez-Walcourt is a village of Wallonia and a district of the municipality of Froidchapelle, located in the province of Hainaut, Belgium.

External links
 

Former municipalities of Hainaut (province)